In Western popular culture, the Chinese word for "crisis" is often incorrectly said to comprise two Chinese characters meaning 'danger' and 'opportunity'. The second character is a component of the Chinese word for opportunity, but has multiple meanings, and in isolation means something more like 'change point'. The mistaken etymology became a trope after it was used by John F. Kennedy in his presidential campaign speeches and is widely repeated in business, education, politics and the press in the United States.

Etymology

Sinologist Victor H. Mair of the University of Pennsylvania states the popular interpretation of weiji as "danger" plus "opportunity" is a "widespread public misperception" in the English-speaking world. The first character  does indeed mean "dangerous" or "precarious", but the second, highly polysemous, character  does not mean "opportunity" in isolation, but something more like "change point".

History
American linguist Benjamin Zimmer has traced mentions in English of the Chinese term for "crisis" as far as an anonymous editorial in a 1938 journal for missionaries in China. The American public intellectual Lewis Mumford contributed to the spread of this idea in 1944 when he wrote: "The Chinese symbol for crisis is composed of two elements: one signifies danger and the other opportunity." However, its use likely gained momentum in the United States after John F. Kennedy employed this trope in campaign speeches in 1959 and 1960, possibly paraphrasing Mumford:
In the Chinese language, the word "crisis" is composed of two characters, one representing danger and the other, opportunity.

Referring to the word has since become a staple meme for American business consultants and motivational speakers, as well as gaining popularity in educational institutions, politics and in the popular press. For example, in 2007, Secretary of State Condoleezza Rice applied it during Middle East peace talks. Former Vice President Al Gore has done so numerous times: in testimony before the U.S. House of Representatives Energy and Commerce Committee; in the introduction of An Inconvenient Truth; and in his Nobel Peace Prize acceptance lecture.

Benjamin Zimmer attributes the appeal of this anecdote to its "handiness" as a rhetorical device and optimistic "call to action", as well as to "wishful thinking".

See also
 May you live in interesting times

References

Further reading
 

crisis
Language comparison
Semantics
Misconceptions